Starting Point Directory is a human edited general web directory that provides websites organized by topic. The search results displayed to the user require an annual subscription fee is required.  Search results are bracketed with Google AdSense advertisements.

In 2006, the directory was sold to a new owner and was re-launched as a human edited directory. Starting Point Directory employs paid editors that review each site and apply a set of quality guidelines to each listing.

History
The directory was founded in 1995 by an early Internet pioneer Frank Addante as a search engine and a directory. The Starting Point Directory was unusual in 1995 in that sites that were listed in the directory would place voting links on their pages. At the end of each month, the site in each category that received the most votes would receive a hot site award and would be profiled in the directory. The site rose in popularity and in 1997 was the seventh most popular Internet site. The site was then sold to a CMGI company, Yesmail, only to be acquired later by Techlabs, Inc. in 1999. The directory was not a priority while under Techlabs ownership and was not actively edited or maintained.

See also
List of web directories

References

External links
Official Website
Nail Salons Directory
Lizily Business Listings

Computer-related introductions in 1995
Web directories